Jeff Gordon is an American racing driver who drove in the NASCAR Cup Series full-time from 1993 to 2015, winning 93 Cup Series races and four Cup championships. Gordon made his stock car debut in the NASCAR Busch Series on October 20, 1990, at North Carolina Motor Speedway for Hugh Connerty, crashing out on lap 33 and ending up with a 39th-place finish. The following year, Gordon began racing in the Busch Series full-time, driving for Bill Davis Racing. In his first year as a Busch driver he won Rookie of the Year. In 1992, Gordon set a NASCAR record by capturing 11 poles in a single Busch Series season. Later in the year, Rick Hendrick watched Gordon race in a Busch Series event at Atlanta Motor Speedway, and Gordon joined Hendrick Motorsports two days later. Gordon made his Winston Cup debut in the season-ending race, the Hooters 500 at Atlanta, finishing 31st after a crash.

During Gordon's career with Hendrick, he won his first race in 1994 at Charlotte Motor Speedway in the Coca-Cola 600, and later became a four-time Cup Series champion. He won his first title the following year in the 1995 season, and went on to win it in 1997, 1998, and 2001. He also won the Daytona 500 three times in 1997, 1999, and 2005. As of 2017, he ranks third on the all-time Cup wins list with 93, the most in NASCAR's modern era (1972–present). Gordon's 81 pole positions is also third all-time; Gordon won at least one pole in 23 consecutive seasons, a NASCAR record. He was also the active "iron man" leader for consecutive races participated in, with 797 through his retirement at the end of the 2015 season.

Over the course of his racing career, Gordon won a total of 98 NASCAR races, 93 of which were in the Cup Series. He also won five races in the Busch Series. His final NASCAR victory came at Martinsville Speedway in 2015 in the Goody's Headache Relief Shot 500. Although he returned on a part-time basis in 2016 as a substitute driver for Dale Earnhardt Jr., this did not result in any further victories; his best result in his return was a sixth-place finish at Martinsville.

NASCAR

Winston/Nextel/Sprint Cup Series
In the NASCAR Cup Series, which was sponsored by Winston, Nextel, and Sprint during Gordon's career, Gordon, the 1993 Rookie of the Year and four-time series champion, won 93 races. Throughout his career, he won at 24 of the 25 tracks at which he competed, leaving Kentucky Speedway the only track where he failed to win. As of the end of the 2019 Monster Energy NASCAR Cup Series season, Gordon's 93 wins rank third all-time behind Richard Petty (200) and David Pearson (105).

Busch Series
In NASCAR's second-level series, known variously as the Busch Grand National Series, Busch Series, and Nationwide Series during Gordon's driving career and now as the Xfinity Series, Gordon won five races. All of those wins were during the period in which Anheuser-Busch's Busch beer brand was series sponsor. Gordon was also the 1991 Busch Series Rookie of the Year.

See also
 NASCAR Cup Series career of Jeff Gordon
 List of all-time NASCAR Cup Series winners

References

Gordon, Jeff
NASCAR race wins
Gordon, Jeff race wins